Major General Rodney Frederick Leopold Keller CBE (2 October 1900 – 21 June 1954) was a notable Canadian Army officer who rose to divisional-level command in the Second World War. He commanded the 3rd Canadian Infantry Division which was assigned to take Juno Beach during the D-Day invasion.

Background
Rod Keller entered the Royal Military College in Kingston, Ontario, in the last years of the First World War. Upon graduating, he joined the Princess Patricia's Canadian Light Infantry, one of the regiments of the Canadian Permanent Force. Like many other promising Canadian officers of that era, he attended Staff College, Camberley in England.

War service
When Canada went to war, Rod Keller was sent overseas as a brigade major. He rose to the command of Princess Patricia's Canadian Light Infantry in 1941 and was promoted Officer Commanding the 1st Canadian Infantry Brigade a few months later. Keller was made a major-general and, between September 8, 1942, and August 8, 1944, he served as General Officer Commanding the 3rd Canadian Infantry Division.
Major-General Keller was popular with his troops, who appreciated his manners and outspoken language; however, a drinking problem and several breaches of security measures before D-Day cost him the support of both his superior officers and his own staff. Ernest Côté, the quartermaster of the 3rd Division, called Keller a "conventional tactician" who was "very much a spit and polish officer who cut quite a figure in his battledress. We always cut a spare uniform for him, ironed and ready to go just in case. He cared for the division and was sensitive to any slight on its reputation. He was a very proud man and on top of the division's training."

During the first month ashore in Normandy, it was noted he was "jumpy and high strung". The quartermaster of the 3rd Division, Côté was frustrated with Keller's chronic indecisiveness on D-Day and later stated in an interview that the responsibility of command seemed to be too much for him. Keller's immediate superiors in I British Corps and 2nd British Army considered him unfit to command the division, but Lieutenant General Guy Simonds, who was scheduled to command II Canadian Corps upon its activation in Normandy, held off on making a decision about his relief, even refusing a resignation by Keller who himself admitted to the strain. During the Battle for Caen, Keller handled Operation Windsor poorly, sending a reinforced brigade in to handle a divisional operation and delegating the planning to one of his brigadiers. Keller was also reportedly shell-shy by August, and rumours began to spread among the division that "Keller was yeller."

Despite the continued complaints from above and below, Simonds, and General Harry Crerar, another of his admirers, refused to relieve him. Fate intervened when he was wounded by friendly fire on August 8.  US bombers accidentally carpet bombed his divisional headquarters during Operation Totalize. Keller received no further active military command. He died ten years later, in 1954, while visiting Normandy.

Legacy
The Royal Military College of Canada was presented with an oil painting of Keller in 1965. Keller was RMC graduate Number 1341.

References

External links
Photo of Rod Keller, Canadian Military Heritage
Personal appointments of Rod Keller
Biography, Juno Beach Centre
Generals of World War II

1900 births
1954 deaths
Canadian Commanders of the Order of the British Empire
People from Tetbury
Royal Military College of Canada alumni
Military history of Canada
Graduates of the Staff College, Camberley
Canadian Army generals of World War II
Princess Patricia's Canadian Light Infantry officers
Canadian generals
Military personnel from Gloucestershire